Glogster is a cloud-based (SaaS) platform for creating presentations and interactive learning. A platform that allows users, mostly students and educators to combine text, images, video, and audio to create an interactive, Web-based poster called glogs on a virtual canvas. Glogster facilitates the conveyance of social information in many different fields such as art, music, photography. Users also have access to a library of engaging educational content posters created by other students and educators worldwide. Glogster enables interactive, collaborative education and digital literacy.

History

Glogster a. s., Inc, was founded in 2007 by Martin Santorcl, Patrik Prepsl, Roman Smola, Stanislav Šrámek and Tomáš Plojhar, with offices in Prague and Boston. They launched the first platform, Glogster.com also in 2007. This platform was initially promoted as a visual network, allowing users to express themselves via “graphic blogs” or “glogs”. However, in response to needs of educators incorporating Glogster into lessons and assignments, Glogster EDU (or edu.glogster.com) was set up alongside Glogster.com in 2009, offering a more secure and educational specific platform. Glogster EDU, has an annual subscription cost but gives educators a dashboard to provide instructions, templates and a private area for their class (es).

The regular Glogster.com, the social network platform, was closed for new registrations and account access ceased in Feb 2015. After this the company focused solely on the Glogster EDU platform. There is, however, a personal type license available for single users. The platform has grown into a worldwide community in over 200 countries, with over 1.9 million teacher accounts with over 17 million student accounts who have created more than 25 million educational glogs, out of 45 million total glogs on the service.

As of August 2022, Glogster has temporarily suspended services provided due to "operational reasons".

Features

Online editor
Glogster's online editor allows users to arrange images, graphics, audio, video, and texts on a single page to create multimedia posters. It also provides access to 10,000 original graphic elements such as backgrounds, text boxes, frames and more. Media can be imported from around the web via URL or uploaded from users’ own files.

Content library
The Glogpedia library is a constantly-growing collection of over 40,000 glogs, selected based on accuracy and presentation, and categorized into 80 subjects under 9 disciplines according to the K-12 curriculum. Glogster users can nominate glogs to be considered for inclusion in the library by clicking a button at the top of any public glog.

Glogpedia content is intended for use in place of, or alongside, conventional curriculum texts, for example as interactive research material or to engage learners with a new topic. Users can also save editable copies of glogs to their own dashboards, and adapt them to their own needs.

Mobile apps

iOS
Glogster released an iOS application for the iPad in September 2014, bringing an updated version of the editor and the content library to the iPad. The Glog interface incorporates a built-in browser known as the Web Picker, allowing users to search for media directly from the app, and drag it onto their glog canvas. The app is also synced with the iPad's built-in camera and mic, allowing users to record video, audio and photos directly onto their glogs.

The iPad application expands learning beyond the traditional classroom, allowing users to create glogs based on events as they happen, and giving them freedom to learn and create in their own time.

Android
In early 2015, Glogster released a Glogpedia library browser application for the Android, with the announcement that full editing functionality for Android would be made available within the year. In October 2015, Glogster released an Android app for tablet devices with full editing functionality.

Glogster in the classroom 
Glogster EDU is used as a learning and teaching tool to foster higher order thinking skills. Creating posters or glogs allows learners to engage closely with a subject, exercising critical thinking and research skills in selecting appropriate media and creative skills in structuring and arranging the finished piece. Glogster is being used in place of traditional poster assignments and demonstrates how versatile such a poster-creation tool can be when partnered with solid teaching pedagogy and teacher creativity. The use of Glogster, motives and excites students to do their work. A study showed that the usage of the Glogster EDU educational platform develops necessary competences, such as, communication skills, creativity and intellectual curiosity, critical and systematized thinking, information and media skills, collaborative and interpersonal skills, problem identification, formulation, and solving and social responsibility.

Training and certification 
In 2015, Glogster launched the GATE (Global Ambassadors for Technology in Education) program, focused on offering Glogster educators training materials and certifications, as well as recruiting a small group of representatives to assist in promoting Glogster online and in their local areas.

Contests, collaboration and partnerships 
In 2016, 2017 & 2018 Glogster was the tool used for the NASA Spinoff Promotion And Research Challenge - OPSPARC. The aim of the challenge was for students to create NASA inspired spinoff ideas and show them by creating a "Glog,"an online multimedia poster via Glogster. There were three levels of the competition- the Elementary School Category for students grades 3-6, the Middle School Category for students grades 7-8 and the High School Category for students grades 9-12. Students were instructed to research spinoffs found in their homes or schools, and just like an engineer, use an engineering design process to take an everyday object and use it in new ways that will solve a problem learning invaluable STEM inspired skills. Students will show off their work by using videos, drawings, pictures and text and submitting them in the form of a glog.

References

Educational technology companies
Internet properties established in 2007
2007 establishments in the Czech Republic
Virtual learning environments

pt:Glogster EDU